or Tadahiko Shimadzu (Shimadzu Tadahiko) was a Japanese politician who served as a member of the National Diet.

Biography 
He was born in Kagoshima City, Kagoshima Prefecture and was born to the House of Shigetomi of the Shimadzu clan. His father is Baron Shimazu Sounosuke. Tadahiko became a baron by succession in 1925. Tadahiko’s younger brother  was a yōga painter.

He graduated from Seikei Business School in 1923 and worked at Mitsubishi Bank for about ten years. Then he served as the president of several companies.

He was elected to a member of the House of Peers of the Imperial Diet from barons in 1939 and he served until 1947 when the House of Peers was abolished. After World War II, he was elected to a member of House of Councillors of the National Diet from Kagoshima at-large district in 1947 election and 1950 election. He was initially an independent member and later belonged to the Liberal Party and then the Liberal Democratic Party. He served as the Chairs of the Committee on telecommunications of the House of Councillors.

References 

20th-century Japanese politicians
Members of the House of Councillors (Japan)
Members of the House of Peers (Japan)
Liberal Democratic Party (Japan) politicians
Politicians from Kagoshima Prefecture
Seikei University alumni
People from Kagoshima Prefecture
1899 births
1980 deaths